Keith Hubert Douglas Barker (born 21 October 1986) is an English first-class cricketer who plays for Hampshire. He is an all-rounder. He previously played professional football, where he was a striker. He came through the academy of Premier League club Blackburn Rovers, from whom he was loaned to Cercle Brugge and Rochdale. He subsequently had short spells at St Patrick's Athletic and Northwich Victoria before moving into cricket.

Early life and football
Barker was born in Manchester to Caribbean parents. His father Keith Barker, Sr. played cricket for British Guiana and came over to Britain to be overseas professional for Lancashire league side Enfield Cricket Club in 1965. Barker's godfather is former West Indies captain Clive Lloyd. Barker also played for Enfield and was offered a contract by Lancashire, but he decided to play football with Blackburn Rovers.

In the 2004–05 academy season, Barker scored 17 goals in 27 appearances, making him the under-18 top scorer, as Rovers won the national academy play-offs. He also scored four times in seven Premier Reserve League North appearances. In 2005–06 he scored 4 times in 11 appearances for the reserves, before being loaned to Belgian feeder club Cercle Brugge in January 2006. He never appeared for their first team.

On 31 August 2006 Barker joined League Two side Rochdale on a three-month loan. He made his professional debut two days later, playing the full 90 minutes in their 1–1 draw with Hereford United at Spotland. He scored one goal for the club in 16 appearances, equalising in a Football League Trophy tie away to Crewe Alexandra on 31 October which finished 1–1, with the hosts winning in a penalty shootout.

Barker joined Irish club St Patrick's Athletic in the summer of 2007 after being released by Blackburn, though his five months there were mostly spent off with injury. On 3 January 2008 he joined Conference National side Northwich Victoria on a free transfer. He made four appearances for the club, all as a substitute.

International career
Barker made one appearance for England under 19s against Belgium on 9 February 2005 in a 1–1 draw.

Cricket
Barker continued to play for Enfield, where he was spotted by former England coach David Lloyd, whose son plays for Accrington. On Lloyd's recommendation he was watched by Warwickshire second team coach Keith Piper, and subsequently offered a trial. In August 2008 he was signed on a contract until 2010, after impressing in the second team.

On 19 April 2009 Barker made his List A debut for Warwickshire against Somerset at Edgbaston. Batting at number 8, he made 28 runs before being bowled by Peter Trego. He then took the wicket of James Hildreth, finishing with figures of 1-47 as Warwickshire lost by 8 wickets. In 2012, he formed an unexpectedly potent opening attack with Chris Wright that played a key part in Warwickshire winning the County Championship with a game to spare. Barker is eligible for England and the West Indies, as his father was born in Barbados.

On 26 September 2018, Barker signed for Hampshire on a two-year deal from 2019 onwards, taking 37 Championship wickets in his first season, before extending his contract further on 15 January 2020. In August 2020, in the opening round of fixtures in the 2020 Bob Willis Trophy, Barker took his 400th first-class wicket.

References

External links

Rochdale Ex-files: Keith Barker
Player Profile at Warwickshire County Cricket Club
Player Profile at Birmingham Bears

                   

1986 births
Living people
Blackburn Rovers F.C. players
Cercle Brugge K.S.V. players
English footballers
Rochdale A.F.C. players
English Football League players
League of Ireland players
St Patrick's Athletic F.C. players
Expatriate footballers in Belgium
Expatriate association footballers in the Republic of Ireland
English expatriate sportspeople in Belgium
English cricketers
Warwickshire cricketers
Hampshire cricketers
People from Accrington
Black British sportsmen
Northwich Victoria F.C. players
Association football forwards
English expatriate sportspeople in Ireland